The 1964–65 season was the 85th season of competitive football in England.

Overview
 After a three-way tussle for the League title between Manchester United, Leeds United and Chelsea, Manchester United came out on top and were crowned champions.
 Liverpool won the FA Cup, beating Leeds United 2–1 in the final.
 Chelsea won the League Cup, beating Leicester City 3–2 in the two-legged final.
 West Ham United won the European Cup Winners' Cup, beating 1860 Munich 2–0 in the final at Wembley Stadium.
 BBC TV's Match of the Day launched at the start of this season.                                
 This was Stanley Matthews's final season as a player.

Diary of the season

21 July 1964: John White, 27-year-old Tottenham Hotspur and Scotland forward, is killed on a North London golf course while sheltering under a tree which was struck by lightning.

22 August 1964: The first edition of BBC TV's Match of the Day is broadcast, featuring highlights of Liverpool v Arsenal at Anfield.

15 September 1964: Stan Cullis, one of the longest serving managers in the Football League, is sacked after 16 years in charge of Wolverhampton Wanderers. He had won three league titles and two FA Cups with them, but recent form has been dismal for the Black Country side whose attendances have now fallen below 15,000 and relegation appears to a real threat to the club.

2 November 1964: Wolves, marooned at the foot of the First Division, appoint former Scotland manager Andy Beattie as their caretaker manager.

6 February 1965: Stanley Matthews plays the final competitive game of his 35-year career for Stoke City against Fulham in the First Division, shortly after his 50th birthday.

15 March 1965: Chelsea defeat Leicester City 3–2 at Stamford Bridge in the first leg of the Football League Cup final.

15 April 1965: A goalless draw in the second leg of the Football League Cup final at Filbert Street gives the trophy to Chelsea.

28 April 1965: Despite losing 2–1 at Aston Villa on the final day of the league season, Manchester United are crowned First Division champions for the sixth time in their history (and the first time since 1957) on goal average ahead of a Leeds United side who have yet to win the top division title.

1 May 1965: Liverpool win the FA Cup for the first time in their history, defeating Leeds United 2–1 in the final at Wembley Stadium.

19 May 1965: West Ham United win the European Cup Winners' Cup at Wembley Stadium with a 2–0 win over 1860 Munich of West Germany in the final.

Notable debuts
8 September 1964: Pat Dunne, 21-year-old Irish goalkeeper, makes his debut for Manchester United in 3–3 league draw with Everton at Goodison Park.

19 December 1964: Ralph Coates, 18-year-old winger, makes his debut for Burnley in a 3–1 home league win over Sheffield United.

Notable retirements
Jimmy Dickinson, 40, Portsmouth centre-half and all-time leading appearance maker for Pompey with a total of 813 games; he also played 48 times for England.

Arthur Rowley, 39, Shrewsbury Town centre-forward and all-time leading Football League goalscorer with a total of 434 goals; he also played for Fulham, West Bromwich Albion and Leicester City.

Deaths
21 July 1964 – John White, 27, Tottenham Hotspur and Scotland forward, was killed on a North London golf course when the tree he was sheltering under was struck by lightning. His goals helped them win the double in 1961, another FA Cup in 1962 and the European Cup Winners' Cup in 1963.

Honours

Notes = Number in parentheses is the times that club has won that honour. * indicates new record for competition

Football League

First Division
Manchester United clinched their sixth First Division title, with teenage Northern Irish winger George Best excelling in a front-line already dominated by Bobby Charlton, Denis Law and David Herd. They finished champions ahead of newly promoted Leeds United on goal average, while third placed Chelsea won the League Cup, 1963 champions Everton finished fourth, and Nottingham Forest completed the top five.

Birmingham City went down in bottom place, while Wolves were relegated to the Second Division for the first time in the postwar era following the dismissal of long-serving manager Stan Cullis.

Second Division
Newcastle United returned to the First Division after four years away as Second Division champions, and were joined in the elite by runners-up Northampton Town, who had started the decade in the Fourth Division.

Manchester City endured one of the worst seasons of their history by finishing 11th and extending their top flight exile into its third season.

Swansea Town and Swindon Town fell into the Third Division.

Third Division
Carlisle United won a second successive promotion and lifted the Third Division championship trophy. They finished a point ahead of runners-up Bristol City, who claimed promotion on goal average ahead of Mansfield Town. Hull City and Brentford missed out on promotion by a slightly wider margin.

Barnsley, Colchester United, Port Vale and Luton Town were relegated to the Fourth Division – completing a six-season fall from the First Division for Luton Town, who had been FA Cup finalists in 1959.

Fourth Division
Brighton sealed promotion to the Third Division as Fourth Division champions. They were joined by Millwall, York City, and the league's newest members Oxford United.

Top goalscorers

First Division
Andy McEvoy (Blackburn Rovers) and Jimmy Greaves (Tottenham Hotspur) – 29 goals

Second Division
George O'Brien (Southampton) – 34 goals

Third Division
Ken Wagstaff (Mansfield Town and Hull City) – 35 goals

Fourth Division
Alick Jeffrey (Doncaster Rovers) – 36 goals

References